Star Worlds Arcade held its grand opening on January 11, 1985 in Maple Park, Illinois, USA, with only 18 arcade games.  Today, with hundreds of games rotated regularly throughout its game rooms, Star Worlds can be found in DeKalb, Illinois, having moved in 2004 when owner and manager Patrick O'Malley and partner Glenn Thomas needed more space and more customers.  Although it is predominantly a video game arcade with a couple of rooms dedicated solely to the Golden Age of Video Arcade Games, it is also a small museum exhibiting a wide variety of collectibles associated with arcade game iconography, home video game consoles and 1980s pop culture in general.  Star Worlds was inducted into the Twin Galaxies International Registry of Historic Video Game Arcades by gaming celebrity Walter Day for being one of the last remaining neighborhood arcades still in operation since the 1980s.

Original arcade game collection
Patrick O'Malley started the arcade as a personal collection of games in his parents' garage when he was still a teenager in Maple Park.  But then he moved the games into a commercial retail space across town when he acquired the recently defunct Star Worlds chain of arcades (formerly located in Geneva, Illinois and West Chicago, Illinois) from Tom Sofranski of Gerault Amusements.  These first 18 games included:

Q*bert
Space Invaders
Hangly-Man
Asteroids
Rapid Fire (video game)
Wizard of Wor
Sky Raiders
Depth Charge
Frogger
Space Encounters
Kangaroo
Donkey Kong
Stargate
Pengo
Le Mans
Scramble
Make Trax
Pac-Man

Star Worlds Arcade and its owners are featured in a number of documentary films, including Star Worlds: A Pocket Full of Tokens and I'm Heading to the Arcade, Man vs Snake
and Go Big.

References

External links
Star Worlds Arcade website
Star Worlds Directions - Google Maps

Video arcades
DeKalb, Illinois
Museums in DeKalb County, Illinois
Amusement museums in the United States
Video game museums
1985 establishments in Illinois